is a 1961 Japanese drama film directed by Hiroshi Inagaki, with special effects by Eiji Tsuburaya. The film is based on historical events taking place in Japan during the beginning of the 17th century.

Plot 
The plot is set about a decade after the battle of Sekigahara. Toshiro Mifune's character, Mohei is a contumacious  wandering samurai with his very own point of view. He arrives in the city of Osaka to look for new beginning. As a backdrop, there unfolds a conspiracy masterminded by the Toyotomi clan to rein in Lord Ieyasu Tokugawa's ambition for personal domination of Japan.

Cast 
 Toshiro Mifune as Mohei
 Kyōko Kagawa as Ai
 Yuriko Hoshi as Senhime
 Yoshiko Kuga as Kobue
 Isuzu Yamada as Yodogimi
 Yosuke Natsuki as Chomonshu Kimura
 Jun Tazaki as Teikabo Tsutumi
 Danko Ichikawa (Sarunosuke Ichikawa) as Saizo Muin
 Akihiko Hirata as Hayatonosho (Hayato) Susukida
 Takashi Shimura as Katagiri Katsumoto
 Koedako Kuroiwa as Nobuo
 Tetsurō Tamba as Sadamasa Ishikawa
 Tadao Nakamaru as Hyogo
 Ryosuke Kagawa as Michiiku Itamiya
 Yu Fujiki as Danuemon Hanawa
 Seizaburo Kawazu as Ōno Harunaga
 Susumu Fujita as Katsuyasu Sakakibara
 Hanshiro Iwai as Toyotomi Hideyori
 Sachi Sakai as Kai Hayami
 Yoshio Kosugi as Gidayu Fujimoto
 Kichijiro Ueda as Jinbei (owner of the equipment shop)
 Chieko Nakakita as Kyoku (of Yae)
 Haruko Togo as woman out of Ono
 Hideyo Amamoto as interpreter
 Junichiro Mukai as Kumoi
 Shoji Ikeda as Chusho Nanjo
 Shiro Tsuchiya as Tosho Horita
 Akira Tani as rice shop owner
 Shin Otomo as Itamiya manager
 Katsumi Tezuka as Shuma Ono
 Senkichi Omura
 Ikio Sawamura
 Koji Uno
 Yasuhisa Tatsumi
 Haruo Nakajima
 Hans Horneff
 Bill Bassman
 Toshiko Nakano
 Osman Yusef

Notes

References

External links 
 

1961 films
1960s action films
Japanese action films
Jidaigeki films
Samurai films
Films set in castles
Films set in Osaka
Films directed by Hiroshi Inagaki
Films scored by Akira Ifukube
Films produced by Tomoyuki Tanaka
Toho films
Osaka Castle
1960s Japanese films